Monacha is a genus of air-breathing land snails, terrestrial pulmonate gastropod mollusks in the subfamily Trochulininae Lindholm, 1927 of the family Hygromiidae, the hairy snails and their allies.

Distribution 
The distribution of the genus Monacha includes western Europe, Central Europe, Mediterranean, Asia minor and Turkey (more than 50 species of Monacha), Georgia, Russia, Arabia, Iran, Azerbaijan (1 species). It is not in Armenia.

The greatest diversity of species is in the Pontic region.

Species
Species within the genus Monacha include:

 Monacha albocincta (P. Hesse, 1912)
 Monacha aniliensis P. L. Reischütz & Sattmann, 1990
 Monacha ascania (Hausdorf, 2000)
 Monacha atacis E. Gittenberger & de Winter, 1985
 Monacha auturica Falkner, 2000
 Monacha badia (Hausdorf, 2000)
 Monacha bithynica (Hausdorf, 2000)
 Monacha cantiana (Montagu, 1803)
 Monacha carascaloides (Bourguignat, 1855)
 Monacha carinata (Hausdorf, 2000)
 Monacha cartusiana (Müller, 1774) - type species
 Monacha cemenelea (Risso, 1826)
 Monacha ciscaucasica (Hausdorf, 2000)
 Monacha claussi (Hausdorf, 2000)
 Monacha claustralis (Menke, 1828)
 Monacha comata (Hausdorf, 2000)
 Monacha compingtae (Pallary, 1929)
 Monacha consona (Rossmässler, 1839)
 Monacha crenophila (L. Pfeiffer, 1857)
 Monacha cretica Hausdorf, 2003
 Monacha crispulata (Mousson, 1861)
 Monacha densecostulata (Retowski, 1886)
 Monacha depressior (Hausdorf, 2000)
 Monacha devrekensis (Hausdorf, 2000)
 Monacha dirphica (E. von Martens, 1876)
 Monacha dofleini (P. Hesse, 1928)
 Monacha elatior (Hausdorf, 2000)
 Monacha eliae (Nägele, 1906)
 Monacha emigrata (Westerlund, 1894)
 Monacha euboeica (Kobelt, 1877)
 Monacha frequens (Mousson, 1859)
 Monacha fruticola (Krynicki, 1833)
 Monacha galatica (Hausdorf, 2000)
 Monacha gemina (Hausdorf, 2000)
 Monacha georgievi (Pall-Gergely, 2010)
 Monacha glareosa (Hausdorf, 2000)
 Monacha gregaria (Rossmässler, 1839)
 Monacha hamsikoeyensis (Hudec, 1973)
 Monacha haussknechti (O. Boettger, 1886)
 Monacha hemitricha (P. Hesse, 1914)
 Monacha heteromorpha (Hausdorf, 2000)
 Monacha ignorata (O. Boettger, 1905)
 Monacha kuznetsovi (Hausdorf, 2000)
 Monacha lamalouensis (Reynès, 1870)
 Monacha laxa (Hudec, 1973)
 Monacha leucozona (Hausdorf, 2000)
 Monacha liebegottae (Hausdorf, 2000)
 Monacha maasseni Hausdorf, 2003
 Monacha magna (Hausdorf, 2000)
 Monacha margarita (Hausdorf, 2000)
 Monacha martensiana (Tiberi, 1869)
 Monacha melitensis (P. Hesse, 1915)
 Monacha menkhorsti (Hausdorf, 2000)
 Monacha merssinae (Mousson, 1874)
 Monacha microtricha S. H. F. Jaeckel, 1954
 Monacha nordsiecki (Hausdorf, 2000)
 Monacha obstructa (L. Pfeiffer, 1842)
 Monacha ocellata (Roth, 1839)
 Monacha oecali Hausdorf & Páll-Gergely, 2009
 Monacha orsini (Porro, 1841)
 Monacha oshanovae I. Pintér & L. Pintér, 1970
 Monacha ovularis (Bourguignat, 1855)
 Monacha pamphylica (Hausdorf, 2000)
 Monacha pantanellii (De Stefani, 1879)
 Monacha parumcincta (Menke, 1828)
 Monacha perfrequens (Hesse, 1914)
 Monacha pharmacia (Hausdorf, 2000)
 Monacha phazimonitica (Hausdorf, 2000)
 Monacha pseudorothii Hausdorf, 2003
 Monacha pusilla (Hausdorf, 2000)
 Monacha riedeli (Hausdorf, 2000)
 Monacha rizzae (Aradas, 1844)
 Monacha roseni (Hesse, 1914)
 Monacha rothii (L. Pfeiffer, 1841)
 Monacha samsunensis (L. Pfeiffer, 1868)
 Monacha saninensis (Pallary, 1939)
 Monacha sedissana (Hausdorf, 2000)
 Monacha solidior (Mousson, 1863)
 Monacha spiroxia spiroxia (Bourguignat, 1868)
 Monacha spiroxia atik (Schutt, 2001)
 Monacha stipulifera (Hausdorf, 2000) 
 Monacha subaii (Hausdorf, 2000)
 Monacha subcarthusiana (Lindholm, 1913)
 Monacha syriaca (Ehrenberg, 1831)
 Monacha terebrata (Hausdorf, 2000)
 Monacha tibarenica Neiber & Hausdorf, 2017
 Monacha venusta (L. Pinter, 1968)

The species Ashfordiana granulata (Alder, 1830) is often also grouped under the genus Monacha.
Taxon inquirendum
 Monacha talischana (E. von Martens, 1880)
Synonyms
 Monacha beieri Klemm, 1962: synonym of Monacha haussknechti (O. Boettger, 1886) (junior synonym)
 Monacha fallax A. J. Wagner, 1914: synonym of Monachoides fallax (A. J. Wagner, 1914) (original combination)
 Monacha ruffoi Giusti, 1973: synonym of Monacha pantanellii (De Stefani, 1879) (junior synonym)
 Monacha tschegemica Schileyko, 1988: synonym of Paratheba roseni (Hesse, 1914): synonym of Monacha roseni (Hesse, 1914) (junior synonym)

References

 Pintér, L. (1977). Studien an Monacha (Gastropoda: Helicidae), I. Über die subgenerische Zugehörigkeit von Monacha gregaria (Rossmässler). Archiv für Molluskenkunde. 108: 53–55.
 Nordsieck, H. (1993). Das System der paläarktischen Hygromiidae (Gastropoda: Stylommatophora: Helicoidea). Archiv für Molluskenkunde, 122 (Zilch-Festschrift): 1-23. Frankfurt am Main
 Bank, R. A. (2017). Classification of the Recent terrestrial Gastropoda of the World. Last update: July 16th, 2017
 Holyoak, D. T. & Holyoak, G. A. (2018). A new genus Zenobiellina for Helix subrufescens Miller, 1822 (Hygromiidae), with description of a new congeneric species from northern Spain. Iberus. 36 (2): 133-147.

External links 
 Fitzinger, L.J. (1833). Systematisches Verzeichniß der im Erzherzogthume Oesterreich vorkommenden Weichthiere, als Prodrom einer Fauna derselben. Beiträge zur Landeskunde Oesterreichs's unter der Enns, 3: 88-122. Wien
 Neiber, M. T. & Hausdorf, B. (2017). Molecular phylogeny and biogeography of the land snail genus Monacha (Gastropoda, Hygromiidae). Zoologica Scripta. 46(3): 308-321

Hygromiidae